す, in hiragana or ス in katakana, is one of the Japanese kana, each of which represents one mora. Their shapes come from the kanji 寸 and 須, respectively. Both kana represent the sound . In the Ainu language, the katakana ス can be written as small ㇲ to represent a final s and is used to emphasize the pronunciation of [s] rather than the normal [ɕ] (represented in Ainu as ㇱ).

* スィ and ズィ are also used to present si and zi pronunciations respectively. For example, 'C' is presented as スィー . See also Hepburn romanization.

Stroke order

Other communicative representations

 Full Braille representation

 Computer encodings

References

Specific kana